AGCT is an acronym for:

Army General Classification Test
The four bases of DNA base pairing